João Carlos Amaral Marques Coimbra (born 24 May 1986) is a Portuguese former professional footballer who played as a midfielder.

Club career
Coimbra was born in Santa Comba Dão, Viseu District. A product of S.L. Benfica's youth system, he appeared in 13 Primeira Liga games with the first team over the course of two seasons, after which he was loaned to Madeira's C.D. Nacional also of the top division for the 2007–08 campaign.

In July 2008, Coimbra was definitely sold by Benfica, joining C.S. Marítimo. Upon arriving, he was immediately loaned to Segunda Liga club Gil Vicente F.C. in a season-long move.

After this, Coimbra returned to Marítimo but was immediately released, moving to another side in division two, G.D. Estoril Praia. He contributed 26 matches (all starts) and two goals in 2011–12, as his team returned to the top tier after an absence of seven years.

Coimbra represented in quick succession Académico de Viseu F.C. and FC Rapid București after leaving Estoril in 2014, the latter from Romania. On 3 August 2015, he signed for Indian Super League franchise Kerala Blasters FC.

In the summer of 2016, Coimbra returned to Portugal, on a one-year deal with U.D. Leiria.

Personal life
Coimbra studied medicine at the University of Lisbon.

Career statistics

Honours
Estoril
Segunda Liga: 2011–12

Portugal
UEFA European Under-17 Championship: 2003

References

External links

1986 births
Living people
People from Santa Comba Dão
Sportspeople from Viseu District
Portuguese footballers
Association football midfielders
Primeira Liga players
Liga Portugal 2 players
Segunda Divisão players
S.L. Benfica B players
S.L. Benfica footballers
C.D. Nacional players
C.S. Marítimo players
Gil Vicente F.C. players
G.D. Estoril Praia players
Académico de Viseu F.C. players
U.D. Leiria players
C.D. Trofense players
Liga I players
FC Rapid București players
Indian Super League players
Kerala Blasters FC players
Luxembourg National Division players
US Mondorf-les-Bains players
Portugal youth international footballers
Portugal under-21 international footballers
Portuguese expatriate footballers
Expatriate footballers in Romania
Expatriate footballers in India
Expatriate footballers in Luxembourg
Portuguese expatriate sportspeople in Romania
Portuguese expatriate sportspeople in India
Portuguese expatriate sportspeople in Luxembourg